Chakma is a Unicode block containing characters for writing the Chakma language of Bangladesh and eastern India.

History
The following Unicode-related documents record the purpose and process of defining specific characters in the Chakma block:

References 

Unicode blocks
Chakma